Joep op de Kamp (born 22 January 1985) is a retired Dutch football defender.

References

1985 births
Living people
Dutch footballers
Fortuna Sittard players
RKVV EVV players
Eerste Divisie players
Association football defenders